Machine Gun Kelly (1895–1954) was an American gangster.

Machine Gun Kelly may also refer to:

Machine Gun Kelly (musician) (born 1990), American rapper and musician
Machine-Gun Kelly (film), 1958 film about the gangster
Harry "Machine Gun" Kelly (born 1961), American basketball player
M. G. Kelly, American radio disk jockey
Kelly Williams, Filipino-American basketball player whose moniker is "Machine Gun" Kelly
"Machine Gun Kelly", a song recorded by James Taylor on his album Mud Slide Slim and the Blue Horizon
Machine Gun Kelly, a 1994 album by Wesley Willis

See also
"Shotgun Tom" Kelly (born 1949), American radio and television personality